Hugo Scheltema (11 June 1918 – 1 September 1996) was a Dutch diplomat. He served as Permanent Representative to the United Nations in New York, as Chairman of the United Nations Economic and Social Council in 1979 and as Chairman of UNICEF from 1982 to 1983. He was also Ambassador to Iraq, Indonesia and Belgium earlier in his career.

He was a son of the tobacco merchant Hugo Scheltema (1890–1939). He studied law and joined the diplomatic service in 1945, and was posted to China for several years.

References

Ambassadors of the Netherlands to Iraq
Chairmen and Presidents of UNICEF
1918 births
1996 deaths
Ambassadors of the Netherlands to Indonesia
Ambassadors of the Netherlands to Belgium
Permanent Representatives of the Netherlands to the United Nations
Dutch officials of the United Nations